"The Doomsday Machine" is the sixth episode of the second season of the American science fiction television series Star Trek. Written by Norman Spinrad and directed by Marc Daniels, it was first broadcast on October 20, 1967.

In the episode, the starship Enterprise fights a powerful planet-killing machine from another galaxy.

Plot
The USS Enterprise, following a trail of mysteriously destroyed star systems, picks up the automated distress beacon of one of Enterprise sister ships, the USS Constellation. Upon arrival, the Constellation is found heavily damaged and drifting in space; Captain Kirk, Chief Medical Officer Dr. McCoy, Chief Engineer Scott, and a damage control team transport to the ship to evaluate her. There they discover the only member of the crew still aboard: the ship's commander Commodore Matt Decker, who is suffering from severe mental shock.

After McCoy injects him with a sedative, Decker explains that he and his crew had discovered a giant machine, miles long, that used beams of antiprotons to tear planets apart, consuming the rubble for fuel. The attack by Constellation on the machine was ineffective and the ship suffered heavy damage. Decker evacuated his crew to one of the planets of the system, which the machine subsequently destroyed. Kirk theorizes that the machine is an ancient doomsday machine, which must be stopped before it reaches more populated sectors of the galaxy. McCoy and Decker transport to Enterprise, which has taken Constellation in tow, while Scott's damage control team attempt repairs on Constellation damaged impulse engines, weapons and shields. Kirk attends to Constellation nonfunctional viewscreen, which, aside from communications from Enterprise, will be his only means of monitoring events outside the ship.

Enterprise's first officer, Spock, informs Kirk of the sudden appearance of the so-called planet killer and it begins to pursue Enterprise. As the boarding party prepares to beam back aboard, the machine attacks Enterprise, damaging the transporter and disrupting communications. Decker, now the senior officer on Enterprise, assumes command and orders a phaser attack. The phasers are useless against the machine as its hull is constructed of solid neutronium, and the ship is then caught in a tractor beam which draws it towards the planet killer's maw. Kirk completes his repair of Constellation viewscreen and is shocked to see Enterprise engaging the machine. Scott has managed to repair impulse engines and recharge one of Constellation phaser banks, so Kirk uses the crippled ship to approach and fire at the planet killer, distracting it long enough for Enterprise to escape its tractor beam. After repairing the transporter and reestablishing voice communications, Enterprise retreats to a safe distance. Spock relieves Decker of command on Kirk's orders and Decker is escorted to Sickbay. However, Decker subdues his security escort and steals a shuttlecraft. Overcome with guilt because of the loss of his crew, Decker informs Spock he is flying the shuttlecraft straight into the maw of the machine. Despite Kirk's plea for him to return to Enterprise Decker does not deviate from his course and dies.

Lt. Sulu reports that the shuttlecraft explosion has reduced the planet killer's power output by a small amount. Realizing that this may have been Decker's intention, and hoping that a starship would do much more damage, Kirk comes up with a plan to explode Constellation inside the planet killer. Over Spock's objections, Kirk insists on piloting the damaged starship himself, and Scott rigs the impulse engines to explode with a thirty-second delay before detonation, warning his captain that once the timer is enabled, there is no way to abort it.

With the rest of the boarding party transported back to Enterprise, Kirk aims Constellation at the maw of the planet killer, triggers the timer, and orders Enterprise to beam him aboard. The transporter malfunctions, and Scott races to set it right with advice from Spock. With virtually no time to spare, Kirk is safely beamed aboard Enterprise as Constellation explodes inside the planet killer, destroying its power system and leaving it dead in space, its threat ended. Kirk and Spock speculate there could be other doomsday machines out there.

Production
Episode writer Norman Spinrad based the script on a novelette "The Planet Eater" that had been rejected by a number of publishers. He revived the idea when he had a chance to pitch it to Executive Producer Gene Roddenberry. "I did 'The Doomsday Machine' fast," he recalled. Spinrad had written the script with actor Robert Ryan in mind to play Commodore Decker, but Ryan was unavailable, owing to prior commitments.

Some sources hold that the episode was influenced by Fred Saberhagen's Berserker series, which features robotic killing machines built as a doomsday device by a now-vanished race to wipe out their rivals. However, author Norman Spinrad denies the influence: "I wasn't conscious of the Saberhagen stuff when I was doing this, but I was certainly conscious of Moby Dick. And, actually, my unpublished novelette, which was the genesis of "The Doomsday Machine", was written before the Saberhagen stuff." Non-canon Star Trek media refer to the device as a Berserker.

According to one source, the model for the USS Constellation was an off-the-shelf AMT Enterprise model painted and torched in places for the battle damage, while other sources claim that the smallest and least detailed Enterprise professional model was altered for the episode. It has also been stated that the Constellation&apos;s hull ID number of 1017 came from simply switching the digits of an Enterprise model's 1701 hull numbers.

The episode was written as a bottle episode, i.e., one that could use existing ship sets to save time and money. According to Spinrad, the episode was so well-received by Roddenberry that he commissioned him to write another for comedian Milton Berle who planned to do a dramatic turn on the show titled "He Walked Among Us".

Music
The Doomsday Machine features a complete original score by Sol Kaplan. Writer James Lileks notes that the music cues for this episode are "intended to belong together, and that’s one of the reasons the episode works like few others: it has a unique symphonic score. Played start to finish, it holds together." Jeff Bond  notes, "Although he wrote only two scores for the series, New York composer Sol Kaplan's music was tracked endlessly throughout the show's first two seasons." Both Lileks and Bond point out similarities between this music and John Williams' award-winning score for Jaws, nearly a decade later. The music for this episode was collected, along with the score for "Amok Time", on the second release from Crescendo Records of music from the series: the first release other than the music from the pilot episodes.

Non-canon sequels to the episode
An advanced version of the Planet Killer appears in the 1991 Star Trek: The Next Generation novel Vendetta. The novel depicts the original Planet Killer as a prototype for a weapon designed to combat the Borg, released in desperation when the weapon's designers realized that the Borg would defeat them before they could finish the more advanced version. In the 2005 episode of  Star Trek: New Voyages, "In Harm's Way", William Windom reprises his role as Commodore Matt Decker almost 40 years later. Star Trek Online features the machine in the Federation storyline.

Reception
In 1991's 25th anniversary of the series, a fan survey of the top ten episodes of the original series ranked "The Doomsday Machine" No. 4 behind only "The Trouble with Tribbles", "The City on the Edge of Forever", and "Amok Time."

For the franchise's 30th anniversary, TV Guide ranked "The Doomsday Machine" No. 4 on its list of the 10 best Star Trek episodes. Zack Handlen of The A.V. Club gave the episode an "A" rating, describing the episode as "very strong stuff", noting effective tension building and the development of Decker's character. Handlen also noted Sol Kaplan's score which "matches the actors' intensity."

In 2010, SciFiNow ranked this the tenth best episode of the original series. In 2012, Christian Science Monitor ranked this the tenth best episode of the original Star Trek. In 2014, Gizmodo ranked "The Doomsday Machine" as the 18th best episode of Star Trek, out of the over 700 ones made by that time including later series.

In 2015, WhatCulture ranked this the 6th best episode of all time in the Star Trek science fiction universe. In 2015, Wired did not recommend skipping this episode in their binge-watching guide for the original series.

In 2016, The Hollywood Reporter rated "The Doomsday Machine" the 48th best television episode of all Star Trek franchise television prior to Star Trek: Discovery, including live-action and the animated series but not counting the movies. Business Insider ranked "The Doomsday Machine" the 13th best episode of the original series. Empire ranked this the 9th best out of the top 50 episodes of all the 700 plus Star Trek television episodes. SyFy ranked guest star William Windom's performance as the self-sacrificing Commodore Matt Decker, as the 4th best guest star on the original series. CNET noted the Doomsday Machine spacecraft as one of the powerful and important spacecraft of the Star Trek franchise. Newsweek ranked "The Doomsday Machine" as one of the best episodes of the original series. Empire ranked "The Doomsday Machine" 9th out of the 50 top episodes of all Star Trek in 2016. Also in 2016, The Washington Post ranked "The Doomsday Machine" the seventh best episode of all the franchise television episodes, remarking it was "good fun" with a "thrilling climax."

At that time, there were roughly 726 episodes and a dozen films released. TVline ranked the episode as having one of the top twenty moments of Star Trek, noting Kirk's line, "Gentlemen, I suggest you beam me aboard…," for the Enterprise to transport him off the Constellation which is about to self-destruct.

In 2018, Collider ranked this episode the 11th best original series episode. PopMatters ranked this the 20th best episode of the original series. They note it as a "suspenseful episode" and praised the musical score by composer Sol Kaplan. A 2018 Star Trek binge-watching guide by Den of Geek, recommended this episode as one of the best of the original series.

In 2019, the Edmonton Journal ranked this as having one of the top ten Spock character moments, pointing out his intervention in Decker's plan to destroy the ship and ensuing conversation.

In 2020, ScreenRant ranked it as the 7th best episode of TOS to re-watch.

In 2021, Luis A. Plata ranked it the #1 BEST all time episode of Star Trek TOS. #2 is "Obsession" and #3 is "The Immunity Syndrome."

References

External links

"The Doomsday Machine" Screen shots from the re-mastered version at TrekMovie.com
"The Doomsday Machine" Full Episode for viewing at CBS.com
"The Doomsday Machine" Music Revealed Documentary about Sol Kaplan's music for the episode

1967 American television episodes
Star Trek: The Original Series (season 2) episodes
Apocalyptic television episodes
Fictional energy weapons
Films scored by Sol Kaplan
Bottle television episodes
Television episodes directed by Marc Daniels